Albert Bechestobill (March 27, 1879 – July 1, 1959) was an American wrestler. He competed in the men's freestyle welterweight at the 1904 Summer Olympics.

References

External links
 

1879 births
1959 deaths
American male sport wrestlers
Olympic wrestlers of the United States
Wrestlers at the 1904 Summer Olympics
Sportspeople from St. Louis